International cricket in the 2006–07 cricket season is defined by major statisticians, such as CricketArchive and Wisden, as those matches played on tours that started between September 2006 and April 2007. Two major ICC tournaments are scheduled for this season, with the Champions Trophy played in October in India, and the World Cup taking place in West Indies in March. In addition, England will defend the Ashes when they go to Australia in November, and all the ten Test nations will be in action during November and December – though Zimbabwe, who are playing Bangladesh during this time, withdrew from Test matches throughout 2006 and will thus only be playing One-day International matches.

Season overview

Pre-season rankings

September

DLF Cup

The Board of Control for Cricket in India has announced that India, Australia and West Indies will take part in a triangular series held at the Kinrara Academy Oval in Kuala Lumpur. The West Indies Cricket Board were in a payment conflict with the West Indies Players' Association about this series, as the WIPA claims it was not informed before the WICB agreed to the matches, but a deal was eventually agreed in early August. The tournament was known as the DLF Cup, the second ODI tournament to be known by this name, following April's India v Pakistan series in the UAE.

Zimbabwe in South Africa

Zimbabwe made a one-week tour of South Africa as warm-up to the Champions Trophy. They lost all four matches on tour, three ODIs to South Africa and a Twenty20 match with domestic side Eagles.

October

Champions Trophy

The 2006 ICC Champions Trophy was held in India from 7 October to 5 November 2006. It was the fifth edition of the ICC Champions Trophy (previously known as the ICC Knock-out). The tournament venue was not confirmed until mid-2005 when the Indian government agreed that tournament revenues would be free from tax (the 2002 tournament had been due to be held in India, but was switched to Sri Lanka when an exemption from tax in India was not granted). Australia won the tournament, their first Champions Trophy victory. They were the only team to only get one loss in the tournament, as all other teams lost at least two matches. West Indies, their final opponents, beat Australia in the group stage, but were bowled out for 138 in the final and lost by eight wickets on the Duckworth–Lewis method. West Indies opening batsman Chris Gayle was named Player of the Tournament.

Preliminary round

Group stage

Knockout stage

New Zealand Women in Australia

New Zealand Women are scheduled to tour Australia in October. The series begins on 18 October, and consists of one Twenty20 international and five One-day Internationals. Australia have made one change to their squad since beating India in February, with Leah Poulton replacing the injured Alex Blackwell. Australia won the series 5–0, though the first three matches came down to the last over.

November

Afro–Asia Cup

The second Afro–Asia Cup was set to involve the African Cricket Association XI take on the Asian Cricket Council XI playing each other in a series of One Day Internationals, but was postponed until June 2007.

ICC Intercontinental Cup

The 2006 Intercontinental Cup continues into this season, with a November match between Kenya and Bermuda. The details are given under the 2006 season.

West Indies in Pakistan

West Indies played three Tests and five One-day Internationals in Pakistan. The tour clashed with a date for a Twenty20 match organised by Allen Stanford, but that game was eventually cancelled and the tour went ahead. In the Test series, Mohammad Yousuf passed Viv Richards' record of most runs in a calendar year, finishing the year with 1,788 Test runs, 665 of which came in this three-match series. Pakistan took a two-nil lead in the ODI series before losing captain Inzamam-ul-Haq to injury, and Marlon Samuels helped West Indies outscore Pakistan with his unbeaten century in the fourth match.

Bermuda in Kenya

Bermuda visited Kenya for three One Day Internationals at the Mombasa Sports Club between 11 and 14 November. The match follows their meeting at the Intercontinental Cup, which was drawn after the final two days of the game were called off due to pitch conditions.  Kenya ended up winning all three matches; Bermuda's highest score of the series was 201 in 50 overs, while Kenya's lowest was 186 in 37.5 overs chasing a target in the second match. Martin Williamson, managing editor of Cricinfo, commented that Kenya "outbatted and outbowled Bermuda, and...looked the more professional side in the field". Dwayne Leverock, Bermuda, and Thomas Odoyo, Kenya, took the most wickets in the series with seven, while Steve Tikolo made 111 in the final ODI to lead the runs tally with 214. Apart from Tikolo, only Tanmay Mishra, Kenya, and Dean Minors, Bermuda, made more than 100 runs in the three matches.

India in South Africa

India played their first tour game in South Africa on 16 November. The tour will last until 6 January, when the third and final Test at Newlands is scheduled to finish.

In the ODI series, India only once managed to bat through the 50 overs once in four completed games, six of the seven highest scores were made by South Africans, and the five highest batting averages in the series were registered by South Africans. Of the six bowlers to take more than five wickets, five of them were South African. Thus, South Africa won the ODI series 4–0. India also played their first Twenty20 International, winning with one ball and six wickets remaining.

England in Australia

England arrived in Australia on 10 November, and played their first Test on 23 November. The Boxing Day Test will be the fourth of the series, which concluded on 6 January. The tour also includes a Twenty20 International at the SCG, and the VB Series.  The tour also includes several exhibition matches between England and local Australian squads.

Australia won the series 5–0, the first whitewash in 86 years, since 1920–21. Glenn McGrath, Justin Langer and Shane Warne all retired from Test cricket after the final game at the SCG.

Associates South Africa Tri-Series

Bermuda, Canada and Netherlands played a six-match triangular series in South Africa during November and December. Bermuda continued their losing streak, losing their three first matches before bowling Netherlands out for 91 in the sixth and final ODI to win the game. Netherlands, however, had already won three games and the triangular series. Canada finished as runners-up, beating Bermuda in both matches but losing by one wicket in the final game against the Netherlands, where Billy Stelling and Mark Jonkman put on 27 off 20 balls for the last wicket as the Dutch chased 205 in 42 overs.

Zimbabwe in Bangladesh

Zimbabwe had said they would not play any Tests 2006, so this tour of Bangladesh only included One-day Internationals. They did not win any of their six matches against Bangladesh, losing the Twenty20 International as well as five successive ODIs.

December

Sri Lanka in New Zealand

Sri Lanka visit New Zealand for the third consecutive summer, this time playing a series of two Tests, five One-day Internationals and two Twenty20 Internationals.

Sri Lankans in New Zealand in 2006–07. 2-Test series drawn 1–1. Twenty20 International series 1–1. ODI series 2–2

Scotland in Bangladesh

The Associate member Scotland toured Bangladesh for two One-day Internationals in December, and lost both matches. They also lost a warmup match to the Bangladesh Cricket Board's Academy team.

Scottish in Bangladesh in 2006–07. Bangladesh won 2-ODI series 2–0.

January

Pakistan in South Africa

Pakistan play three Tests, one T20I and five One-day Internationals in South Africa.

Commonwealth Bank Series

The Commonwealth Bank Series follows the same format as last year, with 12 group stage matches (8 for each team) and a best-of-three final series.  VB is a co-branded sponsor of this series.

Associates Kenya Tri-Series

Kenya hosted Canada and Scotland for a triangular series at Mombasa Sports Club between 17 and 24 January.

West Indies in India

World Cricket League Division One

The first edition of the top tier of the World Cricket League tournament took place in Nairobi, Kenya, from 29 January to 7 February. The six non-Test teams who have qualified for the 2007 Cricket World Cup took part in the round-robin tournament, with the top two teams qualifying for the final, and also qualifying for the 2007 Twenty20 World Championship.

February

Bangladesh in Zimbabwe

Bangladesh played a 4-match ODI series in Zimbabwe from 4 to 10 February.

Sri Lanka in India

Sri Lanka played a 4-match ODI series in India from 8 to 17 February.

Chappell–Hadlee Trophy

The third edition of the Chappell–Hadlee Trophy, the annual One-day International series between Australia and New Zealand, was held in New Zealand from 16 to 20 February.

Antigua Tri-Series

Bangladesh, Bermuda and Canada took part in a triangular series two weeks before the World Cup. All matches were played at the Antigua Recreation Ground.

March

World Cup

Group stage
The 2007 World Cup, the ninth of its kind, begins on 13 March and continues until 28 April. 16 teams will take part, as six non-Test nations join the fray. The teams will play in four groups of four, where the top two teams qualify for the Super Eight stage, played as a round-robin. The top four teams then make it through to the semi-finals.

Super Eights

Knockout stage

References

Further references
 The Cricinfo Archives – 2006/07
 ICC Future Tours Program 2006–07, from ICC. Retrieved 19 August 2006

2006 in cricket
2007 in cricket